INSAT-1B was an Indian communications satellite which formed part of the Indian National Satellite System. Launched in 1983, it was operated in geostationary orbit at a longitude of 74 degrees east. At the end of its seven-year design life it was replaced by the newly launched INSAT-1D, dropping to backup status. In 1992, it was relocated to 93° east, before being decommissioned in August 1993.

Built by Ford Aerospace and operated by the Indian National Satellite System, INSAT-1B was based upon a custom satellite bus developed for the INSAT-1 series of satellites. The spacecraft carried twelve C and three S band transponders, powered by a single solar array. A stabilisation boom was used to counterbalance radiation torques from the satellite's asymmetrical design. The spacecraft was propelled by an R-4D-11 apogee motor.

INSAT-1B was deployed by  during the STS-8 mission. Challenger lifted off from Launch Complex 39A at the Kennedy Space Center at 06:32:00 UTC on 30 August 1983. INSAT-1B was deployed from the orbiter's payload bay at 07:48 UTC on 31 August, with a PAM-D upper stage firing shortly afterwards to place it into geosynchronous transfer orbit. The spacecraft used its own propulsion system to raise itself into geostationary orbit. It received the International Designator 1983-089B and Satellite Catalog Number 14318.

After some initial problems deploying its solar array, INSAT-1B became operational in October 1983. It was located at 74° east for most of its operational life, before being moved to 93° east in 1992. In August 1993 it was decommissioned and raised to a graveyard orbit slightly above geosynchronous altitude.

References

INSAT satellites
1983 in India
1983 in spaceflight
Spacecraft launched in 1983